MechWarrior 3 is a vehicle simulation game, part of the MechWarrior series. It featured a new 3D accelerated graphics engine at the time of its release. The game contains over 20 missions, with access to 18 different mechs. A novelization called Trial Under Fire was written by Loren L. Coleman.

Gameplay 
Mechwarrior 3 is a first-person mecha simulation game, where the player pilots a Mech in each mission. Mechs are giant armored robots and fitted with various projectile and energy weapons. Mechs engage in combat with other mechs as well as traditional military vehicles such as tanks, helicopters, and occasional weapon emplacements. During combat a Mech's weapons and critical components can be damaged, and it is even possible for entire limbs to be blown off of a Mech.

Mech customization is a major aspect of gameplay. The player has near total control over the configuration of each of his or her Mechs. From the type and amount of armor used to various internal components, and all of the Mech's weaponry and ammunition. In the campaign additional parts, weapons, and ammunition are acquired through the missions, captured supplies, and salvaged enemy Mechs.

Also in the campaign, the player controls up to three squadmates, with the ability to issue basic orders such as attack, move, and return to the Mobile Field Bases (MFBs) for repairs.

The Mobile Field Bases are a unique feature not seen in any other Mechwarrior game. The player starts the game with three MFBs, although these can be destroyed. The MFBs travel with the player throughout the missions advancing when ordered to by the player. They carry all the player's supplies, which means there is a weight limit to the amount of supplies the player can keep. The MFBs can provide field repair and resupply provided they are carrying sufficient armor and ammunition. As Mechs do not have shields, and are only protected by armor which is damaged in combat, the MFBs can become crucial in enabling the player to complete a mission.

Plot 
The story opens with a short briefing of the Inner Sphere's Operation: Bulldog, a daring plan to eliminate the most hostile and vicious clan in the Inner Sphere: Clan Smoke Jaguar, led by Anastasius Focht and Victor Steiner-Davion.  Operation Bulldog and Task Force Serpent have already completed their objectives, but there is one last operation left—the one with which the player is tasked—the disruption of a ranking Smoke Jaguar officer's attempt to rally and restore the Clan forces. This mission (codename: Damocles) is to destroy key Smoke Jaguar installations on the planet Tranquil, including a mech factory, a starport, a geothermal power plant, and the Smoke Jaguar control structure. The mission is a commando operation with limited forces, and does not include elimination of the enemy as an objective.

Two dropships are deployed to release the BattleMech force to destroy these installations.  However, while in orbit above Tranquil, a dropship is attacked by naval laser fire.  The Blackhammer is shot down and the remaining dropship, the Eclipse, retreats to safety.  The player was already deployed from the dropship, which had been slightly off target before it was destroyed. The Mobile Field Bases (MFB), which were deployed at the same time as the player, land on target. The player's first mission is to rendezvous with the MFBs and secure the area from hostile forces.

At least seven Mechs are deployed. Two are destroyed by the enemy near the beginning of the game and one toward the end. The novelization mentions one more casualty lost due to a parachute malfunction. The remaining four survivors gradually link up over the course of the game. Twelve more Mechs remain aboard the Eclipse, but they cannot be deployed directly, and an attempt to fight through from a safe landing area fails after heavy casualties. Despite this setback, the player must continue with his objectives, and eventually secure a Clan shuttle to rendezvous with the Eclipse in low orbit.

Pirate's Moon (expansion pack) 

MechWarrior 3: Pirate's Moon is the only expansion pack for MechWarrior 3, with an all new storyline and 20 new missions, plus six new mechs, brand new terrains, and a number of weapons. The player can select either Campaign Missions or Pirate Missions which contain respective stories.

Campaign 
The Lance Leader from MechWarrior 3 is now given an official name known as 'Lieutenant Connor Sinclair' and returns as main protagonist of the campaign missions. Sinclair is assigned to protect the Federated Suns' control over the planet Vale and its resources against New Belt Pirates led by Susie Ryan. During the confrontation, Sinclair and his lancemates encounter overwhelming pirate forces unexpectedly and explore for the further plot to be unveiled.

Pirate Missions 
The player controls 'Scourge', the New Belt Pirate working for Susie Ryan as the forces attempt to attack the Federated Suns' defense and claim control over the resources on Vale.

Reception

Reviews 

MechWarrior 3 received favorable reviews according to the review aggregation website GameRankings. John Lee of NextGen called it "a worthy successor to the two earlier versions that should keep Mech pilots eagerly engaged until the mission packs start rolling out." Although there was only one called Pirate's Moon.

Sales
The game was heavily promoted in the lead-up to its release. It debuted at #2 on PC Data's computer game sales rankings for May 30–June 5, 1999. The title rose to first place the following week, then remained in the top 10 from June 13–July 10. It took positions 1 and 9, respectively, for June and July overall. The game's sales had risen to 99,000 units in the U.S. by the end of July, according to PC Data. Mark Asher of CNET Gamecenter reported that these figures were "good but certainly not what Hasbro Interactive hoped for". Alongside the underperformance of Starsiege and Heavy Gear II, the sales of the game led Asher to speculate that "the mecha market just isn't as big as we thought". The game was absent from PC Data's weekly top 10 by the week ending July 17, and charted 16th for August before exiting the monthly top 20.

In September 2000, Asher wrote that "the evidence seems to be piling up that games that require anything more than a keyboard and mouse for a control setup suffer at the cash register, [but] the FASA license is as strong as ever. Hasbro Interactive expects to sell about 200,000 copies of MechWarrior 3 this year alone."

Awards 
The game was a runner-up for Computer Gaming Worlds 1999 "Science Fiction Simulation of the Year", GameSpots "Science-Fiction Simulation of the Year" and Computer Games Strategy Plus "Sci-Fi Simulation of the Year" awards, all of which ultimately went to FreeSpace 2. The staff of CGSP wrote: "While it [MechWarrior 3] was light on quantity of missions, Zipper finally got the scale right in a Mech sim." The magazine later named the game as a runner-up for its 2000 "10 Best Sci-Fi Simulations" list. The game won the award for "Best Sci-Fi Simulation" at the CNET Gamecenter Awards for 1999. It also won the Origins Awards for Best Action Computer Game of 1999, and for "Best Fantasy Sim" in PC PowerPlays Game of the Year 1999 Awards, whereas it was a runner-up for the "Best Intro" award, which went to Half-Life.

Pirate's Moon 

Pirate's Moon received favorable reviews, albeit slightly less than the original MechWarrior 3, according to GameRankings.

References

External links

1999 video games
BattleTech games
Hasbro games
MechWarrior
MicroProse games
Multiplayer and single-player video games
Origins Award winners
Video games about mecha
Video games developed in the United States
Video games scored by John Broomhall
Video games set on fictional planets
Video games with expansion packs
Windows games
Windows-only games
Zipper Interactive games